The Amb Temples, locally known as Amb Sharif ("Noble Amb"), are part of an abandoned Hindu temple complex on the Sakesar mountain, located at the western edge of the Salt Range in Pakistan's Punjab province. Although foundations go back to the period of Kushan Empire, the temple complex was built in the 9th to 10th centuries CE during the reign of the Hindu Shahi empire.

Location
The ruins are located near Amb Sharef village, on Sakesar mountain in the Soon Valley of Pakistan. The ruins form the westernmost ruins of a string of Hindu temples in the Salt Range mountains that includes the Katas Raj Temples and Tilla Jogian monastic complex.

Architecture
The main temple is roughly 15 to 20 metres tall, and built out of brick and mortar on a square plinth. It is regarded as the "loftiest" of temples built by the Hindu Shahi empire. The temple ruins have three stories, with stairwells leading to inner ambulatories.

The temple is decorated with Kashmiri style motifs on its exterior, including a cusped niche. The structure of the main temple, differs from Kashmiri temples which typically have pointed tops. The main temple is instead similar in style to the nearby Kalar temple, and Kafir Kot temple in Khyber Pakhtunkhwa province.

To the west about 75 metres lies another smaller temple, which is 2 story or 7 to 8 meters high, situated near a cliff. The temple features a small vestibule chamber facing towards the main temple. It was a few metres from a second similarly sized temple, which no longer exists. The entire temple complex was surrounded by a fortification, with the earliest construction at the site dating to the late Kushan period.

Conservation
The site was visited by Alexander Cunningham in the late 19th century, and was partly conserved in 1922-24 by Daya Ram Sahni. The temple had been looted over the centuries, with the last remaining statuary removed from the site in the late 19th century and placed in the Lahore Museum. The site is currently protected by Pakistan's Antiquities Act (1975).

Gallery

See also
 Katasraj temple
 Hinglaj Mata

References

Hindu temples in Sindh